Pemmanahalli is a village in the southern state of Karnataka, India. It is located in the Nelamangala taluk of Bangalore Rural district.

Demographics 
Pemmanahalli had population of 666 of which 353 are males while 313 are females as per report released by Census India 2011.

Geography 
The total geographical area of village is 188.22 hectares.

Bus Route from Bengaluru City 
Yeshwantapura  - Nelamangala

See also 

 Lakkuru
 Bengaluru Rural District

References

External links 

Villages in Bangalore Rural district